EDUNET is a national teaching-learning center in the Republic of Korea. It was launched on September 11, 1996, and has been operated by the Korea Education and Research Information Service (KERIS).

External links
EDUNET
EDUNET vietnam

Education in South Korea